Bruce Hornsby's ninth studio album, a collaboration with bluegrass legend Ricky Skaggs titled Ricky Skaggs & Bruce Hornsby, marks the debut release for the duo's new musical project.  The album features reworkings of Hornsby originals as bluegrass tunes, as well as a number of traditional songs and a Skaggs original composition.  Worthy of note is the cover of "Super Freak" (the Rick James song), here turned into a bluegrass version.

Track listing
 "The Dreaded Spoon" (Hornsby) - 3:02
 "Gulf of Mexico Fishing Boat Blues" (Hornsby) - 3:36
 "Across the Rocky Mountain" (Traditional) - 6:05
 "Mandolin Rain" (Bruce Hornsby, John Hornsby) - 6:09
 "Stubb" (Skaggs) - 4:39
 "Come on Out" (Kennedy, Phil Madeira) - 3:26
 "A Night on the Town" (Hornsby, Hornsby) - 5:14
 "Sheep Shell Corn" (Traditional) - 2:26
 "Hills of Mexico" (Traditional) - 3:50
 "Crown of Jewels" (Hornsby) - 6:21
 "Super Freak" (Johnson, Alonzo Miller) - 4:04

Musicians 
 Ricky Skaggs – vocals, guitar, banjo, fiddle, mandolin, percussion
 Bruce Hornsby – vocals, grand piano, organ, accordion
 Jeff Taylor – accordion (5, 10)
 Cody Kilby – guitars, banjo
 Jerry Douglas – dobro (2)
 Gordon Kennedy – guitar (6)
 Andy Leftwich – fiddle, mandolin
 Stuart Duncan – fiddle (4, 9
 Jim Mills – banjo (1, 8, 11)
 Mark Fain – bass
 Sonny Emory – drums (3)
 Paul Brewster – harmony vocals (6)
 John Anderson – additional backing vocals (11)

Production 
 Producers – Bruce Hornsby and Ricky Skaggs
 Engineers – Brent King, Lee Groitzch and Wayne Pooley.
 Mixing – Brent King
 Mastered by Andrew Mendleson at Georgetown Masters (Nashville, TN).
 Design and Photography – Erick Anderson

Chart performance

References

2007 albums
Bruce Hornsby albums
Ricky Skaggs albums
Albums produced by Ricky Skaggs
Legacy Recordings albums